Springfield is the primary fictional setting of the American animated sitcom The Simpsons and related media. Matt Greoning disclosed after 20 years, that the Springfield the Simpsons live in is in fact in Oregon. state in the United States. The fictional city's geography, surroundings, and layout are flexible, often changing to accommodate the plot of any given episode.

According to the creator of the series, Oregon native Matt Groening, Springfield was inspired by a number of real-life locations (including Springfield, Oregon and Springfield, Massachusetts). However, in order to emphasize it as an example of "Anytown, USA", the location of the fictional Springfield remains a mystery, with various contradictory "clues" being found in numerous episodes of the series.

Creation
The fictional city of Springfield was intended to represent "Anytown, USA" and not be derived from any specific real-life location. However, the producers acknowledge deriving inspiration from numerous locations including The Simpsons creator Matt Groening's hometown of Portland, Oregon, and Mike Scully's hometown, Springfield, Massachusetts.

Springfield was named after Springfield, Oregon, which, as a child, Groening had believed be the fictitious Springfield featured in the 1950s sitcom Father Knows Best. Groening did not intend to place the fictional Springfield in Oregon, contrary to a 2012 interview with him in Smithsonian magazine; he instead adopted the name for the setting of The Simpsons in the hope that "everyone will think it's their Springfield". Al Jean explained that the magazine "misinterpreted something I've heard him say for at least 10 or 20 years. He was inspired by growing up in Portland, but it's really an every town".

Groening liked Second City Television setting of Melonville, a town with a large cast of recurring characters, and used it as inspiration for The Simpsons. He said, "I also figured out that Springfield was one of the most common names for a city in the U.S. In anticipation of the success of the show, I thought, 'This will be cool; everyone will think it's their Springfield.' And they do".

Location

Because of the many contradictory statements regarding Springfield in the show, it is impossible for the town to exist in a specific state. In The Simpsons Movie, Ned Flanders tells Bart that the state where Springfield is located is bordered by the states of Ohio, Nevada, Maine, and Kentucky – only Ohio and Kentucky are neighboring states in reality, and Nevada and Maine are at opposite sides of the US.

The fictional city's unknown and unknowable geography is a recurring joke in the series; the Dayton Daily News called it the "riddle wrapped in an enigma that is Springfield's location". Episodes frequently make fun of the fact that Springfield's state is unidentifiable, by adding further conflicting descriptions, obscuring onscreen map representations, and interrupting conversational references.

David Silverman, who directed the movie and various episodes of the series, joked that Springfield is located in the fictional state of "North Takoma". This is substantiated by the state abbreviations NT and TA used within the show. The telephone area codes for Springfield are 636 (St. Charles County and Western St. Louis County, Missouri) and 939 (Puerto Rico).

To promote The Simpsons Movie, various actual towns and cities across the U.S. called Springfield competed to hold the premiere. The town of Springfield, Vermont, was chosen. In 2016, a New York Times study of the 50 TV shows with the most Facebook Likes found that "of all the Springfields in America, [The Simpsons] is most popular in Springfields in Virginia, Minnesota and New Jersey, and least popular in Springfields in Louisiana, Arkansas and Georgia".

Fictional history
The episode "Lisa the Iconoclast" revealed that Springfield was founded by a group led by Jebediah Springfield (a cover identity for notorious pirate Hans Sprungfeld) who, after misinterpreting a passage in the Bible, left Maryland trying to find "New Sodom." After he refuses to found a town where men are free to marry their cousins, half of the group leave. The dissenters found the nearby town of Shelbyville, named after fellow pioneer Shelbyville Manhattan, and the two cities remain rivals for centuries.

Springfield reaches its pinnacle in the mid-20th century, when it became the home of the world's first Aquacar factory; one half of the U.S. was said to wear Springfield galoshes and the city's streets were literally paved with gold. However, the town's prosperity was short-lived, and, in a 1992 episode, a fictional Time cover story on Springfield is titled "America's Worst City", and in a 1996 episode, Newsweek called the town "America's Crud Bucket".

Topography
Springfield's fictional geography is shown to be comically varied, and includes forests, meadows, mountain ranges, a desert, a glacier, beaches, badlands, canyons, swamps, a harbor, waterholes, and waterways. Major named geographical features includes the Springfield Gorge, Springfield National Forest, the volcanic Mt. Springfield, the West Springfield Desert ("three times the size of Texas!"), the Springfield Badlands (also known as the Alkali Flats), the gigantic Murderhorn Mountain, Springfield Glacier, Mt. Useful National Park, Springfield Mesa, Springfield Monument Park, and Springfield National Park.

The town's climate is usually depicted as dry and sunny, with a bright blue sky. However, in various episodes, it has been subject to many natural disasters, including heatwaves, blizzards, avalanches, earthquakes, acid rain, floods, hurricanes, lightning strikes, tornadoes, and volcanic eruptions.

Springfield's environment is shown as unusually polluted. Overflowing garbage forces the whole town – both population and structures — to move five miles (8km) away from the massive dump that the old town of Springfield had become. Springfield is also home to the state's largest self-sustaining tire fire, which has been burning continuously for many decades. Lake Springfield's pollution almost leads to the town's destruction by an Environmental Protection Agency bomb in The Simpsons Movie, and pollution from the nuclear power plant has mutated the fish in the river, and the Nuclear Power Plant's mascot is Blinky, an orange-colored fish with three eyes. Its atmosphere is so polluted that, in one 1995 episode, it reduces a comet to a tiny rock.

Springfield is shown to feature a large numbered grid plan, ranging from streets at least as low as 3rd Street and at least as high as 257th Street.

Politics, religion, and media
The fictional mayor of Springfield is Joe Quimby. In the episode "Sideshow Bob Roberts", Sideshow Bob runs for Mayor of Springfield and defeats Mayor Quimby, but Bob is later discovered to have committed electoral fraud.

Previous representatives include Horace Wilcox, who dies of a heart attack while in office, and Bob Arnold, who is forced to resign after Lisa exposes his corruption.

Mary Bailey is the fictional governor of Springfield's state.

Sports
The town is home to a number of fictional sporting teams, including the Springfield Isotopes, a minor league baseball team which plays its home games at Duff Stadium; the Springfield Atoms football team at Springfield Stadium; the NBA's Springfield Excitement (formerly the Austin Celtics); and the Springfield Ice-O-Topes hockey team.

Businesses

Springfield Nuclear Power Plant
The Springfield Nuclear Power Plant is a two-unit pressurized water reactor nuclear power plant in Springfield owned by Charles Montgomery Burns. Among the plant's employees are Homer Simpson, Lenny Leonard, and Carl Carlson, and Burns' assistant Waylon Smithers. The plant is shown to be the key supplier of the city of Springfield's energy, and the carelessness of Mr. Burns and the plant's employees often endangers the residents and natural environment of Springfield. Mutated fish with more than two eyes are often shown in the lake behind the power plant, which has a large pipe pumping nuclear waste into it. There is a crow or raven shown living near the Power Plant, which caws whenever an establishing shot of the Power Plant is on screen. A running gag in earlier seasons was the poor security of the plant, with the outside security booth often going unmanned.

The design of Springfield Nuclear Power Plant is often rumored to be based on the troubled Trojan Nuclear Power Plant (closed in 1993 due to defects) near Matt Groening's home town of Portland, Oregon, or the Hanford Site in southeastern Washington. However, Antonia Coffman, Groening's publicist, has said that the Springfield plant's design is generic and that "the Springfield Nuclear Power plant was not based on the Trojan Plant or any other power plant in the country."

Kwik-E-Mart

Kwik-E-Mart is a fictional convenience store run by Apu Nahasapeemapetilon. The Kwik-E-Mart first appeared in the first-season episode "The Telltale Head" (although mentioned in "Bart the General" as the "Quick-e-Mart"). In "Stark Raving Dad", a street sign reading "Highland" is seen outside one of the front windows, in the same blue color as is used for signs for Highland Avenue in Los Angeles. Likewise, three buildings are visible that are similar to some of those that might be seen on that street: two low buildings with bars over the windows, and a third, also with barred windows, which has a mission-style roof and a sign reading "Smog Center."

The episode "Homer and Apu" suggests that Apu is an employee of the Kwik-E-Mart and after losing his job there had to travel to India, where the Kwik-E-Mart head office is located, in the Himalayas. However, Apu mentions at a bachelor auction that he runs his own business in "The Two Mrs. Nahasapeemapetilons".

In addition to the sale of items offered at a typical convenience store, gasoline pumps have been shown in front of the store on two occasions.The Springfield Shopper also sells there, and it is where Principal Seymour Skinner purchases his tabloids. In the episode "Sweet Seymour Skinner's Baadasssss Song", Apu installs 16 new gas pumps to compete with a rival convenience store, the Gas 'N Gulp. However, they, along with the Kwik-E-Mart, are destroyed when Bart accidentally interrupts a live mortar exercise at Fort Springfield, forcing the soldiers to redirect the mortar fire into the town. The episode "Scenes from the Class Struggle in Springfield" also shows the pumps.

In July 2007, convenience store chain 7-Eleven converted 11 of its stores in the United States and one in Canada into Kwik-E-Marts to promote the release of The Simpsons Movie. The locations of the renovated Kwik-E-Marts were: Bladensburg, Maryland/Washington, D.C.; Burbank, California; Chicago; Dallas; Denver; Henderson/Las Vegas; Los Angeles; Mountain View/San Francisco; New York City; Orlando/Lake Buena Vista, Florida; Seattle; and Vancouver/Coquitlam, British Columbia, Canada. These 12 locations, as well as the majority of other North American 7-Elevens, sold products found in The Simpsons, such as "Buzz Cola", "Krusty-O's", "Squishees", pink frosted "Sprinklicious doughnuts", and other Simpsons-themed merchandise. The Squishees were Slurpees that are sold in special collector cups and the Krusty-O's were made by Malt-O-Meal. The promotion resulted in a 30% increase in profits for the changed 7-Eleven stores. This can be seen during the opening of The Simpsons Movie.

The Android's Dungeon & Baseball Card Shop

The Android's Dungeon is a fictional comic book store owned by Comic Book Guy. The comic book store and its owner first appeared in the episode "Three Men and a Comic Book", when Bart sees a copy of the first issue of the Radioactive Man comic on sale for $100.

In the episode "Worst Episode Ever", Bart and Milhouse are given the job of running the comic book store after Comic Book Guy suffers from a stress-induced heart attack and is instructed to try and gain a social life. During their brief tenure at the store, Bart and Milhouse discover a secret room filled with bootleg videotapes of various extremely rare or illegal subjects. These tapes are later confiscated during a police raid on the store.

Barney's Bowl-A-Rama
Barney's Bowl-A-Rama is a fictional bowling alley in Springfield. It is owned by Barney Gumble's Uncle Al. In the episode "And Maggie Makes Three", Homer tells the family the story of Maggie's birth. In this story, Homer explains how he quit his job at Springfield Nuclear Power Plant to work at the Bowl-A-Rama, which was Homer's dream job.

The Leftorium
The Leftorium is a fictional store in the Springfield Mall specializing in products for left-handed people. The store is owned by Ned Flanders, who first started the Leftorium in the episode "When Flanders Failed". At first, business at the store goes very poorly. Irritated with Flanders, Homer wishes that the store would go out of business after receiving the larger half of a wishbone. Homer gets his wish, and the Flanders family are forced to sell many of their possessions, much of which Homer purchases at a meager price of $75. The bank repossesses the Flanders' home and the Leftorium is to be the next asset repossessed. Homer then regrets making this wish and the fact that he never told any of his friends who needed left-handed items about the Leftorium. As a result, he manages to get everyone he knows in town to shop at Ned's store, saving it from closure.

The Leftorium continues to thrive over the following years. However, Flanders mentions in several episodes that the store does not do that well, such as in the season 10 episode "Thirty Minutes over Tokyo", where Ned mentions that the business now has a competitor "Leftopolis" next door to it. In the episode "Home Away from Homer", Ned mentions that a recently opened, left-hand megastore, called "Left-Mart" (a parody of Wal-Mart) is threatening his business. The season 25 episode "White Christmas Blues" reveals that competition from the Southpaw Superstore forced Flanders to downsize the business to a mall cart, the "Leftorium Express", which he splits with a cosmetic saleswoman. In the season 29 episode "Left Behind", the Leftorium closes for good, leaving Flanders unemployed until he finds a new job as Bart Simpson's new teacher.

The writers had wanted to have Flanders own a failing business and the idea for the store was suggested by George Meyer. He got the idea from a friend whose family had owned a left-handed specialty store which had failed.

Springfield Mall
The Springfield Mall is a fictional shopping mall that features comical fictional stores and pastiches, such as the Happy Market, Cost-Mo, Girdles N' Such, Eye Caramba, The Ear Piercery, Happy Sailor Tattoo Parlor, Love Your Computer, Gum4Less, Popular Books, the Leftorium, Nick's Bowling Shop, Stoner's Pot Palace, Bookacchino's, Moe's Express (a mini version of Moe's Tavern), a Mapple Store (a parody of the Apple Store), numerous knockoff Starbucks coffee shops, and several Krusty Burgers.

Bars and restaurants

Moe's Tavern

Moe's Tavern is a fictional local bar in Springfield frequented by Homer Simpson, Carl Carlson, Lenny Leonard, Barney Gumble and barflies Sam and Larry, but is seemingly unpopular with the rest of the city's residents. The tavern is named after and run by Moe Szyslak. Moe's Tavern first appeared in the episode "Simpsons Roasting on an Open Fire". In the first season of The Simpsons, the entrance appears to be a saloon door.

The bar sells mostly Duff Beer, although other beverages are served. A recurring gag is the dirty and dilapidated state of the bar. In "Mommie Beerest", it is revealed that Moe was long able to avoid several enormous health code violations as he is friends with the health inspector. Another episode reveals that the bar's liquor license has expired, is only valid in Rhode Island, and is signed by Moe himself.

Moe's Tavern undergoes several makeovers in various episodes of The Simpsons, but always reverts to its original dark, squalid state. In the episode "Homer's Barbershop Quartet" Moe's Tavern is named Moe's Cavern as a reference to the world-famous Cavern Club in Liverpool, where The Beatles played. Other notable makeovers are in the episode "Bart Sells His Soul", where Moe turns his tavern into a family restaurant called Uncle Moe's Family Feed Bag, and in "Homer the Moe" where Moe turns his tavern into a yuppie bar called "m". In the episode "Mommie Beerest", it is turned into an English pub named Nag and Weasel. In "Flaming Moe", Moe enlists the help of Waylon Smithers to transform the bar into a gay bar called Mo's, although he changes it back again at the end of the episode.

Moe and his tavern are the victim of Bart's ongoing prank calls in earlier seasons, when Bart would call looking for nonexistent people with names that would get Moe laughed at by his customers.

Universal Studios Florida includes a Moe's Tavern in the Springfield section of the park.

Krusty Burger
Krusty Burger is a fictional fast food restaurant chain owned by Krusty the Clown as one of his many branded products and services which appears in many episodes of the series. Krusty Burger is seen as a parody of a typical fast-food chain, like McDonald's, Burger King and Wendy's. Krusty Burger is located across the entire United States; in the episode "Boy-Scoutz 'n the Hood", Homer uses a map of the entire United States with locations of Krusty Burger restaurants. In the episode "The Mook, the Chef, the Wife and Her Homer", Krusty Burger is one of the few burger places open in Springfield, because Krusty has been paying mobster Fat Tony to keep McDonald's and Burger King from establishing local franchises.

A common gag, especially in the later seasons of the show, is the extremely low quality of the food served at the restaurants, a parody of common beliefs and urban legends surrounding American fast food. Documentary filmmaker Declan Desmond has made several exposes on the chain, revealing practices such as stapling together half-eaten burgers and serving them to new customers, and substituting all manner of cheap filler as meat. Krusty also reveals that the Ribwich was made of an unspecified animal with more than four legs, presumably some sort of insect or spider, that was driven into extinction by its production.

Universal Studios Florida includes a Krusty Burger in the Springfield section of the park.

Lard Lad Donuts
Lard Lad Donuts is a fictional donut store in Springfield. The name and the statue of the eponymous boy are likely references to Big Boy Restaurants. In "Treehouse of Horror VI", the Lard Lad statue is brought to life by a mysterious atmospheric disturbance, enraged by Homer Simpson having stolen his giant donut. Universal Studios Florida includes a Lard Lad Donuts in the Springfield section of the park.

Luigi's
Luigi's is a fictional Springfield Italian restaurant owned by Luigi Risotto, who is a parody of the "Italian pasta/pizza chef" stereotype, but seems to be aware of his status as a stock character. Luigi is polite to his customers and treats them with respect when they order, and then loudly insults and belittles them to his cook Salvatore, fully aware that they can hear him from the kitchen. The restaurant also employs an old Italian saucier, who in "Take My Life, Please", claims they can tell what someone's life could have been like by stirring tomato sauce in a certain way. By using his magical tomato sauce, the saucier helps Homer see what his life would have been like if he had won his high school election. Fat Tony and his mob frequently use the restaurant for their meetings.

Luigi takes customer service very seriously.
 
Universal Studios Florida includes a Luigi's in the Springfield section of the park.

The Frying Dutchman
The Frying Dutchman is a maritime-themed restaurant operated by Sea Captain Horatio McCallister. Its cuisine specializes in seafood (to which Marge is allergic), and even the bread has fish in it. Homer sued them for their refusal to honor the 'all you can eat' promise in the episode "New Kid on the Block", and was given a job as a freak attraction "more stomach than man" (to Marge's great embarrassment).
 
Universal Studios Florida includes a Frying Dutchman in the Springfield section of the park.

The Singing Sirloin
The Singing Sirloin is a restaurant where waiters sing everything they say. It is first featured in the Season 1 episode "Life on the Fast Lane"; Marge celebrates her birthday there. Bart also celebrated here after getting an A, however after Homer was unable to pay them for the food, they had to sing on stage to pay for the bill (in the episode "Homer vs. Dignity").

The Happy Sumo
The Happy Sumo is a Japanese restaurant. Among the restaurant's menu offerings are all kinds of sushi, including fugu, which can be fatally poisonous if not properly prepared. The Master Sushi Chef is the only person at the restaurant qualified to prepare fugu. The restaurant also offers karaoke. Akira works as a waiter and translates on occasion for the Simpson family.

The Gilded Truffle
The Gilded Truffle is an upscale restaurant. It features as a place where adult couples without children can go, while Homer and Marge look on wistfully from another restaurant. It also features as the scene of Bart's prank towards Edna, when he pretends to be a man interested in meeting her in person from a personal advertisement and then watches her be stiffed by the fictional date. The Simpsons are able to eat at the restaurant from Lisa and Homer's gambling proceeds following their bonding time of Homer betting on Lisa's football picks.

Schools

Springfield Elementary School
Springfield Elementary School is a fictional local school attended by Bart Simpson, Lisa Simpson, and most other Springfield children. It teaches children from kindergarten through to sixth grade. Springfield Elementary is depicted as a grossly underfunded school that suffers from the incompetence and apathy of its administration, teachers, staff, and students. It is portrayed within the show as a satire of publicly funded schools and education in the United States, an illustrative example and parody of the lengths undertaken by some schools to overcome underfunding.

Edna Krabappel was Bart Simpson's 4th-grade teacher, and from season 23 onwards also neighbor due to marrying Ned Flanders until Krabappel's death in season 25. In "Left Behind", the Leftorium closes, leaving Flanders unemployed, and he returns to Springfield Elementary School, where he finds a new job as Bart Simpson's new teacher, substituting the void left following by his deceased second wife Edna Krabappel.

In 1994, the naming of a new, real-life elementary school in Greenwood, South Carolina, was left up to the students, and the name Springfield Elementary was chosen. The school board was unaware of the connection to The Simpsons until a protest by one group of parents, who argued that the character of Bart Simpson was a poor role model. The name stood, and the school opened in August 1994.

Colleges/universities
Springfield University is a large college which Homer attended in "Homer Goes to College". It teaches several different courses, including nuclear physics, arts management, and the meaning of cartoons. Springfield University also has a fierce rivalry with Springfield A&M University. In the episode "Faith Off", the nickname of the Springfield University football team is revealed to be the Nittany Tide—a reference to the Penn State Nittany Lions and Alabama Crimson Tide.

Springfield Agricultural and Mechanical (A&M) University is a rival institution of Springfield University. Carl Carlson is an A&M alumnus. Springfield A&M's mascot is a pig named Sir Oinks-A-Lot, who was kidnapped by Homer and his three student tutors as a prank in "Homer Goes to College".

Springfield Heights Institute of Technology focuses on the engineering sciences. Professor Frink is a college professor at the university, and it is from where Apu Nahasapeemapetilon earned his doctorate.

Residential

Springfield Retirement Castle
The Springfield Retirement Castle is Springfield's retirement home for the elderly. Some noted residents of the Castle include Abraham "Grampa" J. Simpson and his neighbors, Jasper Beardley, and the Crazy Old Man.

For Grampa Simpson, the Retirement Castle is a lonely place to be. He often gets mad when his family does not come and visit him. The door features a sign reading 'Thank you for not discussing the outside world'. The most interesting way to pass time at the home is to "stake yourself out a good spot at the starin' window", which overlooks nothing but a barren tree, and bingo (the prize being a banana). The staff of the home has little to no respect for the residents, doing things like vacuuming their hair during "nap time", or switching their IV bags with their catheter bags when the former is empty, and the latter is full. In the episode "Old Money", Grampa inherits $106,000 from his girlfriend Beatrice "Bea" Simmons. He uses both this money and his winnings from a gambling junket to refurbish and redecorate the home and has the dining hall renamed in Bea's honor.

Government

The Springfield City Hall 
The City Hall of Springfield serves as the workplace of Mayor Quimby and the City Government. Often it is the site of town meetings regarding an issue facing the city, where the citizens vote to approve a proposal that generally causes havoc (most of the time proposed by Homer) and causes more problems. The building is based on the Chelmsford, Massachusetts public library due to longtime The Simpsons background designer Lance Wilder, being a former Chelmsford resident.

Landmarks

Five Corners
Five Corners is "the only geographic location in the US where five states meet". A boundary marker indicates the exact spot. While on their road trip to Itchy & Scratchy Land, the Simpsons visit Five Corners, where they each "stand in five different states while holding hands". The location is visited again in "The Bob Next Door", where Sideshow Bob plots to kill Bart at the marker where the location's unique property would result in a lack of extraterritorial jurisdiction, explaining it as: "I can stand in one state, fire a gun in a second state, the bullet will travel through the third, hitting you in the fourth, so you fall dead in the fifth. No single act is against any law, but their sum total is the greatest murder..." In reality, no such place exists in the US; the location is a spoof of Four Corners.

Other towns

Shelbyville
Shelbyville is Springfield's neighbor and rival city. It was founded in 1796 by Shelbyville Manhattan, who advocated cousin marriage among his followers, causing a split between himself and Jebediah Springfield. An intense rivalry between the two cities continues today, especially in the sixth-season episode "Lemon of Troy", in which Shelbyville residents steal a prized lemon tree from Springfield. In several episodes, "Lemon of Troy" in particular, it is suggested that Shelbyville is to an extent a parallel version of Springfield. Shelbyville is also the city where Luann van Houten grew up. It also has at least one McDonald's restaurant, a Speed-E-Mart, Joe's Tavern, and a school. Per "Last Exit to Springfield", Shelbyville was at least briefly called "Morganville" during Abe Simpson's youth. According to The Simpsons Movie, Shelbyville is west of Springfield. It is the home of the button fly.

Shelbyville was ranked 10th in "The 10 Best Dystopias" in the December 2005 issue of Wired.

Capital City
Capital City (often spelled Capitol City in early episodes) is the capital and largest city in the state in which the show is set. It is a major urban center, hosting major sports events, conventions, and United Nations conferences. Its nickname is The Windy Apple (a joke by the show's writers, combining the nicknames of New York City's "The Big Apple" and Chicago's "The Windy City"). Landmarks include a Duff brewery, possibly mimicking the Anheuser-Busch brewery in St. Louis, the Cross-town suspension bridge resembling San Francisco's Golden Gate Bridge, the Capital City Stadium, the Capital City Amphitheatre (featuring Krusty the clown), and the intersection of 4th Street and Avenue D. The Simpsons Movie places Capital City just to the north of Springfield.

Brockway
Brockway is mentioned by Lyle Lanley (voiced by Phil Hartman) as a town to which he has sold monorail systems ("Marge vs. the Monorail").

Brockway, Ogdenville, and North Haverbrook are also mentioned in Episode 18 of the TV series Supernatural by Sam Winchester, as locations of past Shtriga activity.

Ogdenville
Ogdenville was first mentioned in "Marge vs. the Monorail", when Lyle Lanley claimed to have sold a monorail to Ogdenville. Ogdenville has also been mentioned in other episodes such as "Saddlesore Galactica", "Scenes from the Class Struggle in Springfield" and "To Surveil with Love". In "Eeny Teeny Maya Moe", Maya is from Ogdenville. Ogdenville has an outlet mall and is separated from Springfield by a rocky desert. In "Coming to Homerica", Ogdenville is a town of barley producing farms that are shut down due to tainted barley being used in a new, vegetarian Krusty Burger. Ogdenvillians are composed of Norwegian immigrants with thick Norwegian accents. They also are big fans of the Minnesota Vikings due to the heavy incidence of Norwegian immigrants in the state of Minnesota. As a small easter egg, during a flu outbreak in Springfield, the hospital only received schemas in Norwegian, which is later confirmed via close-up. Series creator Matt Groening's background is Norwegian and German, which he has described as "two of the unfunniest ethnic groups in the history of the world".

North Haverbrook
North Haverbrook was first mentioned by Lyle Lanley in "Marge vs. the Monorail". Marge arrives in North Haverbrook and finds a desolate ghost town, where the faulty monorail derailed, causing a disaster, chasing away most of their residents and scaring away investors. The remaining North Haverbrook locals have since denied the monorail's existence presumably blaming Lanley for the whole thing that ruined their town's reputation. Marge is met with hostility by the locals, including a woman who works at the 'Monorail Cafe'. She orders Marge to leave her town at once and never speak of the monorail anymore. A resident scientist from Germany, Sebastian Cobb, was the only one willing to help Marge out and save the passengers off the Springfield Monorail from suffering the same fate as North Haverbrook. Lanley is later attacked by the citizens of the town after his plane makes an unscheduled stop there, presumably tipped off by Marge knowing Lanley will answer for his crimes.

North Haverbrook also appeared in "Little Big Girl". After Bart is awarded a driver's license, he gets sick of countless errands and goes for a drive and eventually finds North Haverbrook, and falls in love with a girl named Darcy. In this episode, the town appears to have recovered well from the monorail disaster, as it is now changed from a ghost town to a thriving community with multiple businesses that Bart enjoys. It has a romantic reputation. All signs of the monorail have also disappeared.

It also appears on a road sign as Snake drives towards Mexico with the Kwik-E-Mart on a flatbed trailer during "Marge in Chains".

Cypress Creek
Cypress Creek is a model town created for the workers of the Globex Corporation. It appears in the episode "You Only Move Twice". It is an affluent town and is home to many wildflowers (to which Lisa is allergic). The city is an obvious parody of Silicon Valley or the master-planned communities often built by major corporations.

Guidopolis
In the episode "Midnight Towboy", Homer initially went for a bottle of milk in a little town near Springfield named Guidopolis, where he then subsequently becomes a towtruck driver and is introduced to the vehicle recovery sector. The town is primarily inhabited by Italian-American greasers.

Little Pwagmattasquarmsettport
Little Pwagmattasquarmsettport is a seaside town close to Springfield's State, where the Simpsons went for the Fourth of July in the Flanders's holiday home; the town appears in the episode "Summer of 4 Ft. 2". Nicknamed "Little Pwag", the town contains many beaches and a large boardwalk section, and a fun fair open every summer.

References
Informational notes

Citations

Bibliography

External links
Where Is The Simpsons' Springfield? from the fan-maintained "The Simpsons Archive"

The Simpsons locations
Fictional populated places in the United States
Fictional elements introduced in 1987